A federal parliamentary republic refers to a federation of states with a republican form of government that is, more or less, dependent upon the confidence of parliaments at both the national and sub-national levels. It is a combination of the government republic and the parliamentary republic.

Such republics usually possess a bicameral legislature at the federal level out of necessity, so as to allow for a set, often equal number of representatives of the sub-national entities to sit in the upper house; however, the government, headed by a head of government, will be depending upon the lower house of parliament for its stability or legitimacy.

List of federal parliamentary republics

See also
Unitary parliamentary republic

External links

Republic
Republicanism